George Edward Olsen Sr. (March 18, 1893 - March 18, 1971) was an American bandleader.

Born in Portland, Oregon, Olsen played the drums and attended the University of Michigan, where he was drum major. There he formed his band, George Olsen and his Music, which continued in the Portland area. The group's debut hotel engagement came at the Multnomah Hotel in Portland. He then made the cross-county transition to Broadway, appearing in Kid Boots (1923), the Ziegfeld Follies of 1924, Ziegfeld Follies of 1925, and Good News (1927).

George Olsen and his Music were prolific Victor recording artists and their records are among the most numerous found by record collectors today, testifying to their original popularity. He and his orchestra were in Eddie Cantor's 1928 Broadway hit Whoopee!, and in the 1930 movie version. In the Follies George met a singer, Ethel Shutta, who sings and dances memorably in Whoopee!, and they married, appearing together in nightclubs and on radio. They had two children, George Jr. and Charles; following a divorce, Olsen opened a restaurant in Paramus, New Jersey.  Olsen and Shutta were heard on the Oldsmobile Program on CBS radio in 1933. He also was an orchestra leader for The Jack Benny Program on radio.

Olsen signed with Victor in 1924 and remained as one of Victor's most popular bands until 1933 when he signed with Columbia. He stayed with Columbia through January, 1934. He recorded a single session in 1938 for Decca, and one final date for the rare Varsity label in 1940.

Olsen's bands produced few stars. Singer-saxophonist Fred MacMurray passed through in 1930 on his way to eventual movie stardom, recording a vocal on I'm in the Market for You. Olsen's long-time alto saxist and singer, Fran Frey, with his distinctive, reedy bass-baritone, was perhaps the best known Olsenite until he left in 1933 for a career as a music director in radio.

In 1936, Olsen became leader of Orville Knapp's band after Knapp died in a plane crash. Olsen was chosen to lead the band by Knapp's widow. Morale problems plagued the group, and in 1938, after many musicians had already left, the group disbanded.

A resident of  Paramus, New Jersey, Olsen ran a popular local restaurant there on Paramus Road for many years before he died there on March 18, 1971. According to John S. Wilson in The New York Times, reviewing a retrospective of Olsen's recording "George Olsen and His Music" on RCA-Victor, in 1968, Olsen had a restaurant in Paramus, NJ called "George Olsen's". Wilson noted that "Olsen is there every day greeting guests at lunch and dinner... In the background, the original George Olsen records of the Twenties play softly.

After his divorce from Shutta, Olsen married Claralee Pilcer.

Discography
Beale Street Blues (1924)

Biminy (1924)

Everybody Loves My Baby (1925)

He's The Hottest Man In Town (1924)

My Best Girl (1924)

My Papa Doesn't Two-Time No Time (1924)

Nancy (1924)

Put Away A Little Ray Of Golden Sunshine For A Rainy Day (1924)

Sax-o-phun (1924)

The Slave of Love (1924)

You'll Never Get To Heaven With Those Eyes (1924)

Lullaby of the Leaves (1932)

References

External links

 George Olsen recordings at the Discography of American Historical Recordings.

1893 births
1971 deaths
American bandleaders
Big band bandleaders
People from Paramus, New Jersey
Musicians from Portland, Oregon
University of Michigan alumni
20th-century American conductors (music)
20th-century American drummers
American male drummers
20th-century American male musicians
American radio bandleaders